is a former Japanese football player. He last played for Azul Claro Numazu.

Career
Masanobu Matsufuji joined Japan Football League club Sony Sendai in 2015. He moved to J3 League club Azul Claro Numazu in 2017, retiring in January 2019.

Club statistics
Updated to 2 January 2019.

References

External links

Profile at Azul Claro Numazu

1992 births
Living people
Meiji University alumni
Association football people from Tokyo
Japanese footballers
J3 League players
Japan Football League players
Sony Sendai FC players
Azul Claro Numazu players
Association football defenders